Jacob Willemsz Delff the Younger (1619, Delft – 1661, Delft), was a Dutch Golden Age portrait painter.

Biography

According to Houbraken he won a lucrative commission from the Delft vroedschap to repair his grandfather's schutterstuk after the Delft Explosion in 1654 damaged it. This showed not only the respect the young man had for his grandfather, but also the value that the Delft council placed on their schutterstuk by him.

According to the RKD his wedding portrait and the pendant of his wife were drawn from (now lost) paintings and are in the possession of the Leiden Library. The schutterstuk that Arnold Houbraken mentioned is in the Delft city hall, in the room reserved for weddings.

References

Jacob Willemsz. Delff on Artnet

External links
Vermeer and The Delft School, a full text exhibition catalog from The Metropolitan Museum of Art, which has material on Jacob Willemsz Delff the Younger

1619 births
1661 deaths
Dutch Golden Age painters
Dutch male painters
Artists from Delft